East Rockaway is a train station serving the Long Beach Branch of the Long Island Rail Road. It is located at Atlantic and Ocean Avenues in East Rockaway, New York.

History
The station was established in October 1880 with the opening of the New York and Long Beach Railroad (NY&LB), on the west side of Ocean Avenue and the east side of the tracks, and contained a freight house that was built between October 1 and November 5, 1880. The station became part of the LIRR system in 1909, when the NY&LB merged with the LIRR. The original station house was razed in 1942. 

On December 11, 1951, the station was relocated to its current address and combined with the former Atlantic Avenue station (see below).

Access to the NICE n36 bus was available until April 9, 2017.

Atlantic Avenue station 
The Atlantic Avenue station was originally a signal station on the NY&LB dating back to April 1898. It was located just south of Atlantic Avenue on the east side of the tracks, and was discontinued in 1951. However, due to its  proximity to East Rockaway station, the LIRR was seeking permission from the New York Public Service Commission to eliminate it as far back as November 1912.

Station layout
This station has two high-level side platforms with shelters, each 10 cars long, along with shelters and ticket vending machines. Parking is available on Davison Plaza and in a lot on Ocean Avenue. Parking permits are issued by the village of East Rockaway.

References

External links 

 Station from Ocean Avenue from Google Maps Street View
 Station from Atlantic Avenue from Google Maps Street View
Platforms from Google Maps Street View

Long Island Rail Road stations in Nassau County, New York
Railway stations in the United States opened in 1880
1880 establishments in New York (state)